Pietro Ghersi (1899 – 1 January 1972) was an Italian motorcycle racer and, from 1927, also a racecar driver. He was born in Genoa.

With his brother Mario Ghersi and Luigi Arcangeli he biked in the 1926 Isle of Man TT and 1930 Isle of Man TT in  Moto Guzzi.

Racing cars, he won the Spa 24 Hours 1930 with Attilio Marinoni in an Alfa Romeo 6C. In 1932 Ghersi  was in the Mille Miglia and XXII Targa Florio in an Alfa Romeo 8C 2300. In 1933, with himself as the only driver, he formed the Pietro Ghersi Racing Team based in Genova, using a 2.3-liter Bugatti Type 35, a 1.1-liter Maserati monoposto, and a 2.3-liter Alfa Romeo. He raced for Scuderia Ferrari 1934 and privately in a Maserati 8CM 1935-36. He continued until the 1938 season.

Racing record

Complete European Championship results
(key) (Races in bold indicate pole position) (Races in italics indicate fastest lap)

Notes
 – Ghersi was co-driver with Klinger at the Italian GP and with Dreyfus at the French GP, therefore rules excluded him from the championship.

References

1899 births
1972 deaths
Sportspeople from Genoa
Italian racing drivers
Italian motorcycle racers
Grand Prix drivers
Mille Miglia drivers
24 Hours of Spa drivers
European Championship drivers